Sonny Siaki  (born July 23, 1974) is an American retired professional wrestler of American Samoan descent. He is best known for his time in NWA Total Nonstop Action, where he was a one-time TNA X Division Champion.

Early life 
When Siaki was three, his family moved to Hawaii, then California in the United States of America before settling in Wilmington, North Carolina. Siaki graduated from New Hanover High, received a football scholarship to play at East Carolina University, and majored in Physical Education. He played inside linebacker until a serious stinger injury forced him to stop playing football, preventing him from pursuing a professional football career.

Professional wrestling career

Early career (1998–2002) 
After his school friend Brad Cain notified Siaki that the WCW Power Plant was holding tryouts in early 1999, Siaki attended the tryout and was awarded a WCW developmental contract. He graduated after seven months and wrestled his first televised match on WCW Saturday Night against Allan Funk. Siaki largely appeared on Saturday Night and faced other Power Plant graduates, though he did make several appearances on Thunder and Nitro. Siaki eventually left WCW, unhappy with the way he was being utilized.

Siaki moved on to the Urban Wrestling Alliance in California, where he was known as "Money". After nine months, the UWA folded and Siaki joined Turnbuckle Championship Wrestling where he received further training from the TCW owner, Dusty Rhodes.

NWA Total Nonstop Action (2002–2005) 
On June 19, 2002, Siaki debuted on the first event of the National Wrestling Alliance-Total Nonstop Action as one-third of The Flying Elvises with Jimmy Yang and Jorge Estrada. The Elvises were a comedy heel stable who impersonated Elvis Presley. After the team disbanded, Siaki joined Vince Russo's Sports Entertainment Xtreme, a faction that tried to take over TNA (kayfabe). There he was then given a valet, Desire, a fellow TCW graduate, and earned the nickname "The Ace in the Hole". He won his first and only title in the promotion on December 11, 2002, when he defeated Jerry Lynn to win the TNA X Division Championship. He held the belt until February 12, 2003 when he lost to Kid Kash. In July 2003, Siaki began a feud with D'Lo Brown, who he defeated in a casket match. In October 2003, he formed a tag team with Ekmo, which split when Ekmo began working for All Japan Pro Wrestling.

In April 2004 he and Simon Diamond began feuding with Glenn Gilberti and Johnny Swinger. After Siaki and Diamond were victorious in a tag match, their opponents were forced to wear Irish and Samoan native dress respectively, punishing Gilberti and Swinger for the ethnic jokes they had made in the preceding weeks. Siaki formed a tag team with Apolo, having his most notable match at Lockdown, where they faced Lance Hoyt and Chris Candido in a steel cage tag match. During the match, Candido broke his leg and died four days after due to a blood clot. In December 2005, Siaki's contract with TNA expired, and he declined to re-sign, instead leaving the promotion on good terms.

World Wrestling Entertainment (2005–2007) 
In late December 2005, Siaki signed a contract with World Wrestling Entertainment. He debuted in the WWE developmental territory Deep South Wrestling on February 2, 2006, suffering a minor injury in the process. On February 23, 2006, Sonny returned to Deep South Wrestling as a heel having a match with Damian Steele. Going by the moniker "Cocky Siaki", he and Eric Perez (as Urban Assault) would win the Deep South Tag Team Titles on November 30, 2006. He then began teaming up with Afa Anoa'i, Jr. Both Siaki and former partner Eric Perez were working Raw house shows in March but Siaki suffered a back injury during that tour which left him out of action for 1 month. Siaki continued to tag with Afa Jr. in Deep South until it closed in April 2007. Siaki then re-debuted with Afa, as The Samoan Fight Club, in the new development territory, under the World Wrestling Entertainment (WWE) name, Florida Championship Wrestling. On September 15, 2007, it was reported that Siaki had been released from his developmental contract. Three days after the release, Siaki issued a statement saying that he has had some "personal issues" at home and that his focus was on his family right now, not wrestling.

Late career (2007–2009)
After leaving WWE, Siaki returned to the independent circuit. On September 17, 2008, Siaki announced his intention to retire from professional wrestling because he planned to donate one of his kidneys to his brother. Siaki would only have one kidney remaining, and thus the doctor told him he could not wrestle anymore, effectively ending his ten-year career. He wrestled his final match on January 9, 2009.

Personal life 
He currently resides in Atlanta, Georgia and has a daughter. After retiring from professional wrestling Siaki began working for UPS.

Siaki appeared on an episode of "Family Feud" with his family.

Championships and accomplishments 
Deep South Wrestling
Deep South Tag Team Championship (1 time) – with Eric Perez

Great Championship Wrestling
GCW Heavyweight Championship (1 time)
GCW Interstate Championship (1 time)
GCW Tag Team Championship (2 times) – with David Young and The Wrestler

NWA Wrestle Birmingham
NWA Wrestle Birmingham Tag Team Championship (1 time) – with Elix Skipper

NWA Total Nonstop Action
TNA X Division Championship (1 time)

Turnbuckle Championship Wrestling
TCW Tag Team Championship (1 time) – with Jorge Estrada

References

Interview with Steve Gerweck
Interview with Genickbruch.com

External links 
 
 

1974 births
American male professional wrestlers
American people of Samoan descent
American professional wrestlers of Samoan descent
East Carolina University alumni
Living people
People from Pago Pago
Sportspeople from Atlanta
Sportspeople from Wilmington, North Carolina
TNA/Impact X Division Champions